Renfrew South was a federal riding represented in the House of Commons of Canada from 1867 to 1968. It was located in the province of Ontario. The federal riding was created by the British North America Act of 1867 and was abolished in 1966, with the riding being apportioned into Frontenac—Lennox and Addington, Lanark and Renfrew, and Renfrew North.

Riding history
The South Riding initially consisted of the Townships of McNab, Bagot, Blithfield, Brougham, Horton, Adamston, Grattan, Matawatchan, Griffith, Lyndoch, Raglan, Radcliffe, Brudenell, Sebastopol, and the Villages of Arnprior and Renfrew.

In 1872, the Townships of Hagarty, Richards, Sherwood, Burns and Renfrew, Jones, were added to the South Riding.

In 1892, the part of the village of Eganville south of the River Bonnechère was added to the riding.

In 1924, "Renfrew South" was defined to consist of the part of the county of Renfrew lying south of and including the townships of Richards, Haggarty, Brudenell, Sebastopol, Grattan, Admaston and Horton, and including the part of the village of Eganville that lies in the township of Grattan.

In 1952, it was defined to consist of the part of the county of Renfrew lying south and west of and including the townships of Richards, Hagarty, Algoma South, Grattan, Admaston and Horton, the part of the village of Eganville lying within the township of Grattan, and, in the territorial district of Nipissing, the townships of Airy, Murchison, Dickens, Sabine, and Lyell.

The electoral district was abolished in 1966 when it was redistributed between Frontenac—Lennox and Addington, Lanark and Renfrew and Renfrew North ridings.

Members of Parliament

This riding elected the following members of the House of Commons of Canada:

Election results

|- 
  
|Liberal
|Daniel McLachlin  
|align="right"| acclaimed   
|}

|- 
  
|Liberal
|John Lorn McDougall
|align="right"| 482   
  
|Liberal
|Malcolm Cameron 
|align="right"|264   
|}

|- 
  
|Liberal-Conservative
|James O'Reilly 
|align="right"| 916    
  
|Liberal
|John Lorn McDougall
|align="right"| 645   
|}

|- 
  
|Liberal
|John Lorn McDougall
|align="right"|738   
  
|Conservative
|William Bannerman  
|align="right"| 668    
|}

|- 
  
|Liberal
|John Lorn McDougall
|align="right"| acclaimed   
|}

|- 
  
|Liberal
|John Lorn McDougall
|align="right"| 803   
  
|Conservative
|William Bannerman  
|align="right"|748    
|}

|- 
  
|Conservative
|William Bannerman  
|align="right"|962    
  
|Unknown
|Robert Campbell 
|align="right"|738   
|}

|- 
  
|Liberal
|Robert Campbell 
|align="right"|913   
  
|Conservative
|William Bannerman
|align="right"| 759    
|}

|- 
  
|Liberal
|Robert Campbell
|align="right"| 1,200   
 
|Independent Conservative
|John Ferguson  
|align="right"|1,134    
|}

|- 
 
|Independent Conservative
|John Ferguson  
|align="right"| 1,299    
 
|Unknown
|Duncan McIntyre
|align="right"|1,177   
|}

|- 
 
|Independent Conservative
|John Ferguson 
|align="right"| 1,642    
  
|Liberal
|David Barr
|align="right"| 1,198   
|}

|- 
 
|Independent Conservative
|John Ferguson  
|align="right"| 1,846    
 
|Patrons of Industry
|Robert A. Jamieson
|align="right"|1,424   
|}

|- 
  
|Liberal
|Aaron Abel Wright  
|align="right"| 2,149   
 
|Independent Conservative
|John Ferguson  
|align="right"| 1,796    
|}

|- 
  
|Liberal
|Aaron Abel Wright
|align="right"| 2,168   
  
|Conservative
|John McKay
|align="right"| 1,980    
|}

|- 
  
|Liberal
|Thomas Andrew Low 
|align="right"| 2,721   
  
|Conservative
|John MacKay
|align="right"|2,031    
|}

|- 
  
|Liberal
|Thomas Andrew Low
|align="right"| 2,687   
  
|Conservative
|Martin James Maloney
|align="right"|2,068    
|}

|- 
  
|Liberal
|George Perry Graham 
|align="right"| 2,421   
  
|Conservative
|M. J. Maloney
|align="right"| 2,198    
|}

|- 
  
|Opposition (Laurier Liberals)
|Isaac Ellis Pedlow
|align="right"| 3,256   
  
|Government (Unionist)
|Lawrence Thomas Martin
|align="right"| 3,182  
|}

|- 
  
|Liberal
|Thomas Andrew Low 
|align="right"| 4,083   
  
|Conservative
|Robert George Wilson
|align="right"| 2,675    

|Labour
|John Henry Findlay
|align="right"| 2,432  

|}

|- 
  
|Liberal
|Thomas Andrew Low
|align="right"|acclaimed   
|}

|- 
  
|Conservative
|Martin James Maloney
|align="right"| 6,336    
  
|Liberal
|Thomas Andrew Low
|align="right"| 4,925   
|}

|- 
  
|Conservative
|Martin James Maloney
|align="right"| 5,207    
  
|Liberal
|Joseph Lawrence Murray
|align="right"|4,986   

|}

|- 
  
|Conservative
|Martin James Maloney
|align="right"| 6,404    
  
|Liberal
|Thomas Andrew Low 
|align="right"| 6,144   
|}

|- 
  
|Liberal
|James Joseph McCann 
|align="right"| 6,054   
  
|Conservative
|Martin James Maloney 
|align="right"| 3,440    

|}

|- 
  
|Liberal
|James Joseph McCann
|align="right"| 6,228   
  
|Conservative
|Martin James Maloney
|align="right"| 5,236    
|}

|- 
  
|Liberal
|James Joseph McCann
|align="right"|7,182   
  
|National Government
|James Anthony Maloney
|align="right"| 4,872    
 
|Co-operative Commonwealth
|John Clifford McManus
|align="right"| 835   
|}

|- 
  
|Liberal
|James Joseph McCann
|align="right"| 7,909   
  
|Progressive Conservative
|Allan Alexander McLean
|align="right"| 6,412    
 
|Co-operative Commonwealth
|John Clifford McManus
|align="right"|486   
|}

|- 
  
|Liberal
|James Joseph McCann
|align="right"| 8,627   
  
|Progressive Conservative
|Allan Alexander McLean
|align="right"| 6,395    
 
|Co-operative Commonwealth
|George Calver
|align="right"|382   
|}

|- 
  
|Progressive Conservative
|James William Baskin 
|align="right"| 8,782    
  
|Liberal
|James Joseph McCann
|align="right"|7,791   
|}

|- 
  
|Progressive Conservative
|James William Baskin
|align="right"|  9,259    
  
|Liberal
|D. Wallace Stewart
|align="right"| 8,148   
|}

|- 
  
|Progressive Conservative
|James William Baskin
|align="right"|8,732    
  
|Liberal
|Murray Joseph Daly
|align="right"| 8,254   
 
|New Democratic
|Leonard Laventure
|align="right"| 427   

|}

|- 
  
|Liberal
|Joe Greene
|align="right"| 8,765   
  
|Progressive Conservative
|James William Baskin
|align="right"| 8,210    

 
|New Democratic
|Ernest Henry Briginshaw
|align="right"| 316   
|}

|- 
  
|Liberal
|Joe Greene
|align="right"| 8,932   
  
|Progressive Conservative
|James William Baskin 
|align="right"|7,505    
 
|New Democratic
|Earl McDonald
|align="right"| 581   
|}

See also 
 List of Canadian federal electoral districts
 Past Canadian electoral districts

References 
 , History of Federal Ridings since 1867, Parliament of Canada

External links 
The Parliament of Canada

Former federal electoral districts of Ontario